Jericho Gawanab (born 21 May 1980), is a multiple award-winning Namibian rapper, songwriter and entrepreneur. He is regarded as the most successful hip hop artist in the country. He won the coveted Best Male Artist at the Namibian Annual Music Awards (2011) becoming the first hip hop artist to do so.

After establishing Ghetto Child, his own record label, he rose to fame with the release of his debut studio album, Check Who's Back (2006). Gawanab, professionally known as Jericho, continued his success by releasing studio albums which include: Lights Out (2007); Street Fame (2010); Let Me Be Me (2014) which features major South African rapper Cassper Nyovest and the legendary Hip Hop Pantsula; The Walls of Jericho (2016) and The Recovery (2020).

Early life 

Jericho Jerome Gawanab was born 21 May 1980 in Windhoek, the capital city of Namibia and was raised by his single mother in the city's dangerous Katutura township. In an article, Jericho stated that the street became his father and at the age of 18 he was sentenced to 5 years in prison. After being released in 2004, he pursued Hip Hop music even though the music industry was dominated by Kwaito.

Music career

2006: Check Who's Back 

In 2006, Jericho established his own record label, Ghetto Child and released his debut studio album Check Who's Back. He achieved major critical success with the album. His lead single, “Check Who’s Back”, was a reintroduction of himself on the scene after being incarcerated. The single was very well received and broke barriers for Hip Hop because Kwaito dominated the music industry. His second single, “Still Love You”, featuring Dixon was released and also received positive reviews.

2007: Lights Out 

With the success of Check Who’s Back, Jericho released his sophomore studio album, Lights Out. The album's lead single, “Lights Out”, featuring Prolific Oracle was Jericho turning off the spotlight on the new rappers that emerged claiming to be the best rappers in the country. The second single, "To My Fans", was Jericho thanking his fans for all their support and it received positive reviews. The third hit single “I’m Still Ghetto” was a reminder to everyone who claimed that Jericho changed since he became famous that he was still the same ghetto child.

2010: Street fame 

Jericho's debut album sounded new and the sophomore album had the same energy and confidence. However, people were claiming that Jericho won't be able to release quality material again since it has been so long. This is when Jericho started working on a new album which he released in 2010 titled Street Fame produced by Araffath. It was critically acclaimed. The third studio album's title was to tell his critics that even though they try to cut him out of the music industry, he will always be famous in the streets because of the support he gets from his fans. Like in most cases with an artist's third album, it turned out to be the most ground breaking album.

The lead single was “Heaven’s Missing Angel” followed by “Yabona” and then “He Ta Pa Te” featuring Tunakie and Max T which were all released with music videos shot by renowned Ogopa Deejays. The album was so well received that Jericho released two more singles “Helele” and “Say You Say Me” from the album. In 2011, Street Fame went on to win three awards at the 2011 Namibian Annual Music Awards including the coveted Best Male Artist which was the first ever time for a Hip Hop artist/album because the industry was dominated by Kwaito artists.

2014: Let Me Be Me 

With the ground breaking success of Street Fame, Jericho released his fourth major studio album, Let Me Be Me. The album received generally positive reviews. The album's lead single, “Let Me Be Me”, was Jericho telling critics to let him be. It was controversial because he had a feud with former record producer Araffath. The second single, “Am I Dreaming”, was followed by “I'm Still Here” featuring Sally Boss Madam. The third single “We The Greatest” featuring Lil D, Sunny Boy and The Dogg. The fourth single Jericho released from the album “Los My Uit” was so huge because he collaborated with Cassper Nyovest and the legendary superstar Hip Hop Pantsula (HHP). This was followed by another monster hit “I Promise”.

2016: The Walls of Jericho 

The name of the fifth studio album was inspired by the events in The Holy Bible. It has singles such as “Don't Change On Me”, it features Sunny Boy and Exit on “Keep It Silent” and on “Starting All Ova” he features DJ Dozza. The album received mixed reviews.

2020: The Recovery 

Jericho battled depression. He sought out GOD, decided to do away with his old life, repented and became born again. His fans supported him and encouraged him to work on his mental health. After a four-year hiatus from the music industry, Jericho made a comeback and released The Recovery. It spawned hit singles such as: "Shibobo”, “Khoeb Khoes”, “The Recovery”, “Omundu Ouandje” and “As Men We Can”. The album received positive reviews by critics and they praised Jericho's lyrical abilities.

Artistry 

Style and rapping technique

Critics have praised his ability of carrying a theme over his albums and his ability to rhyme words in Khoekhoe his mother tongue. Jericho is one of the few artists who still write lyrics allowing cohesive story telling.

Feuds 

Sanlam NBC Music Awards

Jericho engaged in a public dispute with Sanlam NBC Music Awards because they allowed The Dogg who is a Kwaito artist and not a Hip Hop artist to enter the Best Rap category and win instead of a real Hip Hop artist such as himself.

Black Vulcanite

A rapper named Milk had beef with Jericho and released a diss track. When Jericho met Milk at a show, he got into a violent fight with Milk and Milk's friend, rapper Mark Mushiva jumped in to aid Milk.

J-Black

J-Black released a diss track which he claimed was aimed at rappers who haven't made a million dollars but claim to have made it in life. Jericho angrily confronted the rapper at a recording studio about the diss track. They sorted it out and squashed the beef.

Araffath

According to an article, after the ground breaking success of Street Fame, Jericho's third studio album, Araffath and Jericho had beef. The award-winning producer accused Jericho of failing to settle his studio fees but apparently they had a barter agreement. It continues to say that the agreement was for Jericho to make a good album while Araffath gets the exposure he direly needed. Jericho raps about Araffath and other critics in the 2014 hit song Let Me Be Me.

Gazza

Jericho engaged in another public beef with Gazza and Gazza Music Productions (GMP) artists. A deadly incident occurred which led to Jericho being hospitalised after getting into a violent fight with popular journalist and GMP employee, Chris-Paul “Krespo” Haingura.

According to an article, during a GMP event where Jericho was booked to perform, he was being mistreated and when he complained about it to the organisers Krespo got into a deadly fight with Jericho and stabbed him with a broken bottle in the face and right hand. Jericho opened a case of attempted murder at NamPol against Krespo. Krespo however claimed that he too laid assault charges against Jericho and said that he stabbed Jericho in self-defence because Jericho hit him first.

Jericho was quoted saying that he was hit by a car and then got beaten up by GMP artists known as Streetkidz as he lay on the street. According to the article, the incident happened at an event where took place in September 2010. Gazza said that GMP cannot be held responsible for running Jericho over nor for the violence against him by his employees in their individual capacity and wished Jericho a speedy recovery.

Controversies 

Legal issues

Jericho has allegations against him that he assaulted his then girlfriend, his former business partner popularly known as “Webster”, Krespo and robbing a Namibian Defence Force soldier. According to an article, Jericho is busy clearing his name of all allegations against him.

Christianity 

In 2018 Jericho decided to do away with his old life, repented and gave his life to God becoming born again. In an interview on The Tribe he stated that he moved out of Windhoek City to the town of Karibib.

Awards 

Namibian Annual Music Awards

•	2011 Best Rap/Hip-Hop (Street Fame)

•	2011 Best Producer (Street Fame)

•	2011 Best Male Artist (Street Fame)

Discography 

•	2006 Check Who’s Back

•	2007 Lights Out

•	2010 Street Fame

•	2014 Let Me Be Me

•	2016 The Walls of Jericho

•	2020 The Recovery

References 

1. Gordon, J. (2013). Breaking Down Jericho's Walls. Namibian Sun

2. Mupetami, L. (2014). Jericho Pleads 'Let Me Be Me'''. The Namibian

3. Kaakunga, R. (2016). Jericho Rebuilds 'The Walls of Jericho' to Drop a Classic. The Namibian

4. Nakaziko, P. (2021). Jericho revives career with Recovery album. The Namibian

5. Kathindi, A. (2014). Mark Mushiva, the black narcissist. The Villager

6. Haingura, C. J-Black kisses J-Twizz. Retrieved from https://www.thevillager.com.na/articles/521/J-Black-kisses-J-Twizz

7. Haingura, C. (2013). Araffath and fall of Jericho bond. The Villager

8. Angula, C. (2010).The Namibian

9. (2020.). Jericho beats court case''. NAlebrity

10. Che Ulenga. (2021). The Tribe Exclusive With Jericho. The Tribe

Damara people
Namibian hip hop musicians
1980 births
Living people
Musicians from Windhoek